John Sewell (July 20, 1867 in Georgia – December 1, 1938 in Miami, Florida ) was the third Mayor of Miami.

John W Sewell was born in 1867 in Elbert County, Georgia, and moved with his parents to Florida when he was 19 years old. Sewell, working for Henry Flagler, served as foreman and superintendent for the Florida East Coast Railway during the construction of the line from Jacksonville to Miami and later joined the hotel construction department. After helping to construct The Royal Poinciana Hotel and The Breakers Hotel at Palm Beach, Sewell moved to Miami in 1896 to work on the Royal Palm Hotel. While working on the hotel, Sewell stumbled upon the burial grounds of the Tequesta Native-Americans. Sewell gave away some of the skulls as souvenirs, and ordered African-American laborers to move the remaining bones and bury them in a hole. Sewell remained in the employ of the Florida East Coast Railway until 1899, when he left to concentrate his efforts on the mercantile establishment jointly owned with this brother. He was Mayor of the City of Miami from 1903 to 1907.

After serving in local politics, Sewell began the construction of his house in 1912. Built on the highest point in the city, the house was named  Halissee Hall from the Seminole word meaning "New Moon."

Sewell wrote a self-published autobiography entitled John Sewell's Memoirs and History of Miami, Florida. It included an appendix describing his witnessing the attempted assassination of president-elect Franklin D. Roosevelt in 1933. The book is valuable as a primary source of information on pioneer days in Miami.

His brother,  E.G. Sewell was 13th, 16th and 19th Mayor of Miami.

He is buried in the Miami City Cemetery.

See also 

 List of mayors of Miami
 Government of Miami
 History of Miami

References

 University of Miami website
  
 Sewell, John. John Sewell's Memoirs and History of Miami, Florida. (No place): (No publisher), (No date). But self-published in Miami in 1933.

1867 births
1938 deaths
Mayors of Miami